African Review was a magazine published by the government of Kwame Nkrumah in Ghana. Prominent contributors have included Maya Angelou and Jean Carey Bond (at the same time her husband Max Bond worked as an architect for Nkrumah). Artwork in the magazine included work by Tom Feelings. Julian Mayfield was the first editor of the magazine. The University of Cambridge has archived editions.

A monthly magazine it was launched at a time of revolutions and protests.

References

Society of Ghana
Nkrumaism
Magazines published in Africa